Saint Sergius was a 3rd-century Roman soldier venerated as a Christian saint and martyr, almost always paired with Saint Bacchus as Saints Sergius and Bacchus.

Saint Sergius may also refer to:

 Sergius of Cappadocia (died 304), Cappadocian monk and martyr
 Saint Sarkis the Warrior (4th century), the Armenian form of Sergius; it is unclear if he should be identified with Saint Sergius
 Pope Sergius I (died 701), pope and saint
 Sergios Niketiates (died 843), Eastern Orthodox saint venerated for his role in the restoration of the veneration of icons
 Sergius of Valaam (10th century), Greek monastic
 Sergius of Samarkand, Church of the East saint
 Sergius of Radonezh (1314–1392), Russian spiritual leader and monastic reformer
 St. Sergius Orthodox Theological Institute in Paris

See also
 Little Hagia Sophia, the Church of Saints Sergius and Bacchus
 Sergius (disambiguation)
 Maalouf